Dreams 1 (ドリムス。(1) Dorimusu Wan), stylized as Dreams (1), is Dream Morning Musume's first original studio album.

Overview

It was released on April 20, 2011. The album was released in two editions: a regular, 2-CD set and a limited edition, 2 CD+DVD combo. The 1st CD contains remakes of past singles, album tracks and one "commercial song" from Afternoon Musume, called Afternoon Coffee. The 2nd CD is basically a compilation of Morning Musume's early singles in their original recordings. The DVD contained two bonus materials.

Track listing

Disc 1 
Atto Odoroku Mirai ga Yattekuru!
Joshi Kashimashi Monogatari (2011 Dreams Ver.)
Mikan
Roman (My Dear Boy)
Aijin  no Youna Kao Oshite
Morning Coffee (2011 Dreams Ver.)
Sexy Boy (Soyokaze ni Yorisotte)
Ame no Furanai Hoshi dewa Aisenai Daro?
Aozora ga Itsumademo Tsuzuku You na Mirai de Are!
Afternoon Coffee

Disc 2 
Summer Night Town
Daite Hold on Me!
Memory Seishun no Hikari
Love Machine
Koi no Dance Site
Happy Summer Wedding
I Wish
Ren'ai Revolution 21
The Peace!
Sōda! We're Alive

DVD 
2011.01.28 Debut Event Digest
Jacket Photoshoot Making of

Hello! Project
2011 albums